Calif Records is a Kenyan record label based in Nairobi's California estate, known for the Genge genre of music.

It was founded in 2000 by record executive & producer Clement "Clemo" Rapudo, together with Juacali and Nonini.  It is among two leading music production houses in Kenya, the other being Ogopa Deejays.

Current artists

List of artists who have been signed to Calif Records at least some part of their career

Jua Cali
 Nonini
Mahatma

Former Artists

Vikki Ocean aka Raudy
Masha
Choku
Circuite & Joel
Flexx
Jimw@t
Lady S
Czars
Mahatma
Nonini
Pilipili
Ratatat
Mejja
Size 8

References

External links 
 

Kenyan record labels